From January 21 to June 3, 1980, voters of the Democratic Party chose its nominee for president in the 1980 United States presidential election. Incumbent President Jimmy Carter was again selected as the nominee through a series of primary elections and caucuses, culminating in the 1980 Democratic National Convention, held from August 11 to August 14, 1980, in New York City.

Carter faced a major primary challenger in Senator Ted Kennedy of Massachusetts, who won 12 contests and received more than seven million votes nationwide, enough for him to refuse to concede the nomination until the second day of the convention. This remains the last election in which an incumbent president's party nomination was still contested going into the convention.

Primary race 
At the time, Iran was experiencing a major uprising that severely damaged its oil infrastructure and greatly weakened its capability to produce oil.  In January 1979, shortly after Iran's leader Shah Mohammad Reza Pahlavi fled the country, lead Iranian opposition figure Ayatollah Ruhollah Khomeini returned from a 14-year exile and with the help of the Iranian people toppled the Shah which in turn led to the installation of a new government form that was hostile towards the United States.  The damage that resulted from Khomeini's rise to power would soon be felt throughout many American cities.  In the spring and summer of 1979 inflation was on the rise and various parts of the country were experiencing energy shortages.  The gas lines last seen just after the Arab/Israeli war of 1973 were back and President Carter was widely blamed.

President Carter's approval ratings were very low—28% according to Gallup, with some other polls giving even lower numbers. In July Carter returned from Camp David and announced a reshuffling of his cabinet on national television, giving a speech whose downcast demeanor resulted in it being widely labelled the "malaise speech."  While the speech caused a brief upswing in the president's approval rating, the decision to dismiss several cabinet members was widely seen as a rash act of desperation, causing his approval rating to plummet back into the twenties. Some Democrats felt it worth the risk to mount a challenge to Carter in the primaries. Although Hugh Carey and William Proxmire decided not to run, Senator Edward M. Kennedy finally made his long-expected run at the presidency.

Ted Kennedy had been asked to take his brother Robert's place at the 1968 Democratic National Convention and had refused. He ran for Senate Majority Whip in 1969, with many thinking that he was going to use this as a platform for the 1972 race. However, then came the notorious Chappaquiddick incident that killed Kennedy's car passenger Mary Jo Kopechne. Kennedy subsequently refused to run for president in 1972 and 1976. Many of his supporters suspected that Chappaquiddick had destroyed any ability he had to win on a national level. Despite this, in the summer of 1979, Kennedy consulted with his extended family, and that fall, he let it leak out that because of Carter's failings, 1980 might indeed be the year he would try for the nomination. Gallup had him beating the president by over two to one, but Carter remained confident, famously claiming at a June White House gathering of Congressmen that if Kennedy ran against him in the primary, he would "whip his ass."

Kennedy's official announcement was scheduled for early November. A television interview with Roger Mudd of CBS a few days before the announcement went badly, however. Kennedy gave an "incoherent and repetitive" answer to the question of why he was running, and the polls, which showed him leading the President by 58–25 in August now had him ahead 49–39. Meanwhile, U.S. animosity towards the Khomeini régime greatly accelerated after 52 American hostages were taken by a group of Islamist students and militants at the U.S. embassy in Tehran and Carter's approval ratings jumped in the 60-percent range in some polls, due to a "rally ‘round the flag" effect and an appreciation of Carter's calm handling of the crisis. Kennedy was suddenly left far behind.  Carter beat Kennedy decisively in Iowa and New Hampshire.  Carter decisively defeated Kennedy everywhere except Massachusetts, until impatience began to build with the President's strategy on Iran.  When the primaries in New York and Connecticut came around, it was Kennedy who won.

Momentum built for Ted Kennedy after Carter's attempt to rescue the hostages on April 25 ended in disaster and drew further skepticism towards Carter's leadership ability.  Nevertheless, Carter was still able to maintain a substantial lead even after Kennedy won the key states of California and New Jersey in June.  Despite this, Kennedy refused to drop out, and the 1980 Democratic National Convention was one of the nastiest on record.  On the penultimate day, Kennedy conceded the nomination and called for a more liberal party platform in the Dream Shall Never Die speech, considered by many as the best speech of his career, and one of the best political speeches of the 20th Century.  On the stage on the final day, Kennedy for the most part ignored Carter.

As of 2020, Kennedy remains the last challenger to defeat an incumbent in any of his/her party's statewide presidential primary contests.

Far-right politician David Duke tried to run for the Democratic presidential nomination. Despite being six years too young to be qualified to run for president Duke attempted to place his name onto the ballot in twelve states stating that he wanted to be a power broker who could "select issues and form a platform representing the majority of this country" at the Democratic National Convention.

Candidates

Nominee

Withdrew during primaries or convention

Also withdrew during primaries 
 Jerry Brown, Governor of California
 Cliff Finch, Governor of Mississippi

Results

Endorsements

Convention 

Presidential tally
 Jimmy Carter (inc.) – 2,123 (64.04%)
 Ted Kennedy – 1,151 (34.72%)
 William Proxmire – 10 (0.30%)
 Koryne Kaneski Horbal – 5 (0.15%)
 Scott M. Matheson – 5 (0.15%)
 Ron Dellums – 3 (0.09%)
 Robert Byrd – 2 (0.06%)
 John Culver – 2 (0.06%)
 Kent Hance – 2 (0.06%)
 Jennings Randolph – 2 (0.06%)
 Warren Spannaus – 2 (0.06%)
 Alice Tripp – 2 (0.06%)
 Jerry Brown – 1 (0.03%)
 Dale Bumpers – 1 (0.03%)
 Hugh L. Carey – 1 (0.03%)
 Walter Mondale – 1 (0.03%)
 Edmund Muskie – 1 (0.03%)
 Thomas J. Steed – 1 (0.03%)

In the vice-presidential roll call, Mondale was re-nominated with 2,428.7 votes to 723.3 not voting and 179 scattering.

See also 
1980 Republican Party presidential primaries
Jimmy Carter rabbit incident
2016 Democratic Party presidential primaries

Notes

References

Further reading 

 
Jimmy Carter
Walter Mondale
Ted Kennedy
Jerry Brown